The 1983 Virginia Slims of Detroit was a women's tennis tournament played on indoor carpet courts at the Cobo Hall & Arena in Detroit, Michigan in the United States that was part of the 1983 Virginia Slims World Championship Series. The tournament was held from October 3 through October 9, 1983. Eighth-seeded Virginia Ruzici won the singles title and earned $28,000 first-prize money.

Finals

Singles
 Virginia Ruzici defeated  Kathy Jordan 4–6, 6–4, 6–2
 It was Ruzici's 3rd title of the year and the 24th of her career.

Doubles
 Kathy Jordan /  Barbara Potter defeated  Rosie Casals /  Wendy Turnbull 6–4, 6–1
 It was Jordan's 2nd title of the year and the 21st of her career. It was Potter's 3rd title of the year and the 15th of her career.

Prize money

References

External links
 International Tennis Federation (ITF) tournament edition details

Virginia Slims of Detroit
Virginia Slims of Detroit
October 1983 sports events in the United States